Hannah cum Hagnaby is a civil parish in the East Lindsey district of Lincolnshire, England.
Hannah was used in the Bronze Age as there is evidence of a Round Barrow.
In antiquity Hannah was known as Hannay. The church, in Hannah, is dedicated to Saint Andrew and is a Grade I listed building, built of greenstone about 1758, with early 19th, and some 20th-century, alterations.

Hagnaby Priory, later Hagnaby Abbey, was in Hagnaby. Fragments of the priory, including octagonal shafts and window tracery, exist at Hagnaby Abbey Farm   to the west. English Heritage has noted the existence of the suppressed priory through evidence of aerial photographs and building debris, and grassed foundations of a later formal garden and post-medieval house.

References

External links

Civil parishes in Lincolnshire
Villages in Lincolnshire
East Lindsey District